Francisco Solano may refer to:

Francis Solanus, also known as Father Francisco Solano, Franciscan missionary and Saint
Chief Solano, also known as Sem-Yeto, a Chief of the Suisunes Tribe of California
Mission San Francisco Solano, mission built in 1843 in the town of Sonoma, California
Francisco Solano Asta-Buruaga y Cienfuegos, Chilean politician
Francisco Solano López Grance (born 1987), Paraguayan footballer
Francisco Solano Patiño (1923–1990), Paraguayan footballer
Francisco Solano (Spanish writer), born 1952

See also
Solano (surname)